Bindel is a surname. It may refer to:

 Julie Bindel (born 1962), British feminist writer
 Paul Bindel (1894–1973), German painter